Mattampally mandal is one of the 23 mandals in Suryapet district of the Indian state of Telangana. It is under the administration of Kodad revenue division with its headquarters at Mattampally. It is bounded by Mellachervu mandal towards East, Huzurnagar mandal towards North, Garidepally mandal towards west, Guntur district of Andhra Pradesh towards South.

Villages 
 census of India, the mandal has 10 settlements.
The settlements in the mandal are listed below:

Notes
() Mandal headquarter

References

Mandals in Suryapet district